Willy or Willie is the surname of:

 Drew Willy (born 1986), American football quarterback
 Nikita Willy (born 1994), Indonesian actress and pop singer
 Robert Lee Willie (1958–1984), American kidnapper, rapist and murderer
 Theophilus Albert Willy (1845–1916), American politician
 William Willy (1703?–1765), English politician, Member of Parliament from 1747 to his death